Events in the year 1953 in Norway.

Incumbents
 Monarch – Haakon VII
 Prime Minister – Oscar Torp (Labour Party)

Events

 1 June –The first Bergen International Festival opens.
 16 July – Parliament voted to move the main base for the Navy from Horten to Bergen.
 11 September – The Norwegian Consumer Council established
 12 October – The 1953 Parliamentary election takes place.
 15 November – Four men suspected of spying for the Soviet Union were arrested in Kirkenes.
 The Norwegian Academy for Language and Literature (Det Norske Akademi for Sprog og Litteratur) is founded.

Popular culture

Sports

Music

Film

Literature

Notable births

6 January – Jon Eberson, jazz guitarist
10 February – Aud Folkestad, politician
18 February –  Erling Aksdal, jazz pianist
6 March – Jan Kjærstad, author
21 March – Per Inge Torkelsen, humorist (died 2021).
13 April Tom Olstad, jazz drummer
24 April – Nina Bjerkedal, civil servant
24 April – Øyvind Sandberg, film director
8 May – May Hansen, politician
12 May – Odd Riisnæs, jazz saxophonist
2 June Vidar Johansen, jazz saxophonist
30 June Ståle Wikshåland, musicologist
13 July – Sigurd Ulveseth, jazz upright bassist
27 July – Hildegunn Eggen, actress.
19 September – Olav Berstad, diplomat
21 September – Lars Saabye Christensen, author
7 November – Erik Balke, jazz saxophonist
7 December – Arne Nævra, photographer and politician, member of the Storting.

Full date unknown

Erik Blücher, political activist
Nils Lid Hjort, statistician and professor
Per Hannevold, principal bassoonist of the Bergen Philharmonic Orchestra
Stein Erik Lunde, novelist, children's writer, biographer and textbook writer.

Notable deaths

11 January – Hans Aanrud, author, poet and playwright (born 1863)
31 January – Fanny Schnelle, politician, women's rights advocate, teacher and humanitarian (born 1866)
9 March – Ole Iversen, gymnast and Olympic silver medallist (born 1884)
2 April – Halfdan Hansen, sailor and Olympic gold medallist (born 1883)
20 May – Lorentz Brinch, barrister, military officer, resistance member and politician (born 1910).
18 June – Thomas Thorstensen, gymnast and Olympic gold medallist (born 1880)
24 June – Jentoft Jensen, politician (born 1901)
12 July – Otto Olsen, rifle shooter and Olympic gold medallist (born 1884)
18 July – Ole Jensen Rong, politician (born 1885)
4 September – Magdalon Monsen, soccer player and Olympic bronze medallist (born 1910).
12 September – Sigrid Boo, author (born 1898)
9 December – Issay Dobrowen, composer and conductor (born 27 February 1891).

Full date unknown
Solveig Haugan, stage and movie actress (born 1901)
Kristen Holbø, painter and illustrator (born 1869)
Johan Martin Holst, surgeon and military doctor (born 1892).
Christian Pierre Mathiesen, politician and Minister (born 1870)
Jonas Pedersen, politician (born 1871)
Marius Nygaard Smith-Petersen, physician and orthopaedic surgeon in America (born 1886)
Alfred Trønsdal, politician (born 1896)
Eirik Vandvik, professor in literature (born 1904)

See also

References

External links